Ferdinando's Focacceria, founded in 1904, is New York City's oldest Sicilian restaurant. It is the third oldest Italian restaurant behind Rao's and Bamonte's.  It is located at 151 Union Street in Carroll Gardens, Brooklyn.

Panelle is their most popular dish.

History
Ferdinando’s was near the Brooklyn waterfront and they were a sandwich shop for the longshoremen working there.

In popular culture
The restaurant appeared in The Departed by Martin Scorsese.

References

Restaurants in New York City